The Mayor of the City of Jersey City is the head of the executive branch of the government of Jersey City, New Jersey, United States. The mayor has the duty to enforce the municipal charter and ordinances; prepare the annual budget; appoint deputy mayors, department heads, and aides; and approve or veto ordinances passed by the City Council. The mayor is popularly elected in a nonpartisan general election. The office is held for a four-year term without term limits, although the current term is a four-and-a-half-year term, due to a change in election dates.

Forty-four individuals have held the office of mayor since the City of Jersey City was chartered on February 22, 1838. Dudley S. Gregory was the inaugural mayor of the city, and served on three separate occasions for a total of five years. The current mayor is Steven Fulop. He defeated former mayor Jerramiah Healy in the May 2013 election and assumed office on July 1, 2013.

Due to a change in election law approved by Jersey City voters at the end of 2016, mayoral elections now take place in November instead of May. Although the mayorship has historically been a four-year term in Jersey City, and law prescribes the mayorship as being a four-year term in the future, due to the calendar change in elections, one mayorship was a four-and-a-half-year term, beginning July 2013 and ending at the end of 2017.

Duties and powers
The City of Jersey City is organized as a mayor–council form of government under the Faulkner Act (Optional Municipal Charter Law). This provides for a citywide elected mayor serving in an executive role, as well as a city council serving in a legislative role. All of these offices are selected in a nonpartisan municipal election and all terms are four years. Like all mayors under the  Under state law, the mayor has the duty to enforce the charter and ordinances of the city, and all applicable state laws; report annually to the council and the public on the state of the city; supervise and control all departments of the government; prepare and submit to the council annual operating and capital budgets; supervise all city property, institutions and agencies; sign all contracts and bonds requiring the approval of the city; negotiate all contracts; and serve as a member, either voting or ex-officio, of all appointive bodies.

Like all mayors under the Faulkner Act's mayor-council provision, Jersey City's mayors vested with very broad executive power. He has the power to appoint department heads with the approval of the City Council; to remove department heads subject to a two-thirds disapproval by the City Council; approve or veto ordinances subject to an override vote of two-thirds of the council; and appoint deputy mayors.  The mayor is permitted to attend and participate in meetings of the City Council, without a vote, except in the case of a tie on the question to fill a council vacancy.

Elections

Under the original 1838 charter, mayors were elected citywide for a term of one year. In 1868 the State Legislature extended the term of office to two years. In 1892, the Legislature again changed the term of office, extending it to five years. The city adopted a commission form of government under the Walsh Act in 1913. This form provided for a five-member commission with both executive and legislative powers elected for four years. The Commissioners elected one of their number as mayor. Under this system, the mayor's only specific power was to appoint the school board. Otherwise, he was first among equals, with no powers over and above his fellow commissioners.  Jersey City adopted its current mayor-council form of government under the Faulkner Act on May 7, 1961.

Under the non-partisan form of municipal government, elections for mayor are held every four years on the second Tuesday in May. If no candidate receives a majority of votes, a runoff election is held on the fourth Tuesday following the general election. The term of office commences on July 1. The next Jersey City mayoral election is scheduled to be held in 2017.

Succession
In the event of an absence, disability, or other cause preventing the mayor from performing his duties, the mayor may designate the business administrator or any other department head as acting mayor for up to 60 days. In the event of a vacancy in the office, the President of the City Council becomes acting mayor, and the council has 30 days to name an interim mayor. If no interim mayor is named, the Council President continues as acting mayor until a successor is elected, or the council reorganizes and selects a new President. Prior to 1971, there was no automatic succession law. The office was left vacant for 47 days in 1963 when the City Council failed to reach a decision on appointing an interim mayor.

Mayors

Higher offices held
The following is a list of higher public offices held by mayors, before or after their mayoral term(s).

See also
 Timeline of Jersey City, New Jersey

References

External links

 
1838 establishments in New Jersey
Jersey City, New Jersey